Stadelmann is a German surname. Notable people with the surname include:

Christian Stadelmann (1959–2019), German violinist
Dylan Stadelmann (born 1989), Swiss footballer
Hans Stadelmann (1941–1977), Swiss motorcycle racer
Rainer Stadelmann (1933-2019), German Egyptologist
Robert Stadelmann (born 1972), Austrian Nordic combined skier
Rolf Stadelmann (born 1948), Swiss rower

See also
Stadelman

Surnames of Swiss origin
German-language surnames